Øraker is a light rail station on the Oslo Tramway.

Located at Øraker in Ullern, it was opened in 1924, when the Lilleaker Line was extended to Jar.

In February 2009, the part of the line west of Lilleaker station was closed due to upgrades on the Kolsås Line. The curtailing of the line eliminated Øraker station for the time being, disappointing the area residents.

On 1 December 2010 the Station was reopened after extensive work being done to the next station Jar.

References

Oslo Tramway stations in Oslo
Railway stations opened in 1924
1924 establishments in Norway